Governor Sanford may refer to:

John Sanford (1605-1653) governor of Newport and Portsmouth
Mark Sanford (born 1960) governor of South Carolina
Peleg Sanford (1639–1701), Governor of the Colony of Rhode Island and Providence Plantations from 1680 to 1683
Terry Sanford (1917-1998) governor and later senator of North Carolina